José Miguel Ribeiro (Amadora, Portugal, 18 January 1966) is a Portuguese film director.

Biography 

José Miguel Ribeiro was born on 18 January 1966 in Amadora, Portugal. Just studying Fine Arts at the School of Belas-Artes from Lisboa and started working as a draftsman in 1990.

Start making a short animation in 1994 among the highlights O Banquet dóna Rainha and O Ovo. In 1999 done A Suspeita, short with which he was awarded 26 international awards, highlighting the Cartoon d'Or in 2000. In 2004, he made a cartoon series of 1.40 minutes Home Things that consists of 26 episodes, where the protagonists are the things that are in a house: the mop, the toothbrush, the glasses, the vacuum cleaner etc. The series was honored with several international awards.

Filmography

Shorts

Television

Films

External links

References 

1966 births
Living people
Portuguese animators
Portuguese film directors
People from Amadora